In enzymology, a trans-acenaphthene-1,2-diol dehydrogenase is an enzyme that catalyzes the chemical reaction

(+/-)-trans-acenaphthene-1,2-diol + 2 NADP+  acenaphthenequinone + 2 NADPH + 2 H+

Thus, the two substrates of this enzyme are (+/-)-trans-acenaphthene-1,2-diol and NADP+, whereas its 3 products are acenaphthenequinone, NADPH, and H+.

This enzyme belongs to the family of oxidoreductases, specifically those acting on diphenols and related substances as donor with NAD+ or NADP+ as acceptor. This enzyme is also called .

References

 

EC 1.10.1
NADPH-dependent enzymes
Enzymes of unknown structure